Huang Guanjun (1987 – 22 May 2021) was a Chinese marathon runner; he died in the Gansu ultramarathon disaster.

Huang was the champion in the men's hearing-impaired marathon at China's 2019 National Paralympic Games. He died on 22 May 2021, at the age of 34, when high winds and freezing rain struck a long-distance race in Baiyin, Gansu, China. Twenty other runners died in the tragedy.

He had impaired hearing after an "injection error" when he was one year old, and also could not speak. Having difficulty finding employment, he had, according to his friends, "joined races over the years in the hopes of winning some prize money".

See also
Liang Jing, another champion runner who died in the Gansu ultramarathon

References

1987 births
2021 deaths
Chinese male marathon runners
Paralympic competitors for China
Sport deaths in China
Deaf competitors in athletics